The Metropolitanate of Skopje is an Eastern Orthodox eparchy, currently under the jurisdiction of the Orthodox Ohrid Archbishopric, an autonomous and canonical branch of the Serbian Orthodox Church in North Macedonia. Its seat is in Skopje. It is a metropolitan diocese of the Orthodox Ohrid Archbishopric, headed by Archbishop Jovan Vraniškovski of Ohrid, who is also styled Metropolitan of Skopje.

History
The see of Skopje is one of the oldest sees in the region. The modern name of the city of Skopje was derived from the name of its predecessor, the ancient Roman city of Scupi. It was one of the most important cities in the Roman province of Moesia Superior and since the end of the 3rd century the capital of its successor province of Dardania. The ancient Bishopric of Scupi was situated near the modern town of Skopje, where the remains of an episcopal basilica have been found and excavated. The exact date of the foundation of the Bishopric of Scupi is not known, but it already existed by the beginning of the 4th century. In that time, the bishop of ancient Scupi was also the Metropolitan of Dardania.

After the division of the Roman Empire in 395, the city of Scupi, with the rest of Dardania, remained part of the Eastern Roman or Byzantine Empire. Up to the beginning of the 6th century, the episcopal see of Scupi was already under supreme ecclesiastical jurisdiction of the Archbishopric of Thessaloniki. In 535, by the decree of emperor Justinian I (527–565), it was transferred to newly created Archbishopric of Justiniana Prima. Byzantine rule in that region finally collapsed at the beginning of the 7th century, and the church life was later renewed after the Christianization of Serbs.

After the successful Byzantine campaigns of 1018 and the reestablishment of imperial rule in Bulgarian and Serbian lands, by the order of emperor Basil II an autonomous Archbishopric of Ohrid was created in 1019, under the supreme ecclesiastical jurisdiction of the Ecumenical Patriarchate of Constantinople. Imperial charters of 1019 and 1020 mention the Bishopric of Skopje among eparchies under the jurisdiction of the Archbishopric of Ohrid. In 1282, the region of Skopje was incorporated into the Kingdom of Serbia, and the see of Skopje was placed under the jurisdiction of the Serbian Orthodox Church. In 1346, the Bishop of Skopje was granted the honorary title of Metropolitan, on the occasion of the proclamation of the Serbian Patriarchate. In 1392, the city was conquered by Ottoman Turks, and soon after the see was returned under the jurisdiction of the Archbishopric of Ohrid.

In 1557, when the Serbian Patriarchate of Peć was restored, the Metropolitanate of Skopje was returned under its ecclesiastical jurisdiction. The Epachy of Skopje was one of the most important sees of the Serbian Patriarchate. In 1711, Metropolitan Atanasije I of Skopje was elected Serbian Patriarch. In 1747, Metropolitan Atanasije II of Skopje was also elected Serbian Patriarch. Since 1766, when the Serbian Patriarchate was abolished, the Eparchy of Skopje came under the jurisdiction of the Ecumenical Patriarchate of Constantinople. In 1912, the Serbian army liberated Skopje from Ottoman rule. Soon after that, negotiations were initiated with the Patriarchate of Constantinople, and in 1920 the entire region was again returned to the jurisdiction of the Serbian Orthodox Church. In 1930, Metropolitan Varnava Rosić of Skopje was elected Serbian Patriarch.

In 1959, the Serbian Orthodox Church granted ecclesiastical autonomy to eparchies in the Republic of Macedonia. After the unilateral and uncanonical proclamation of autocephaly of the Macedonian Orthodox Church in 1967, ecclesiastical order was disrupted for a long time. When the Republic of Macedonia (now North Macedonia) proclaimed its independence from Yugoslavia in 1992, the Serbian Orthodox Church decided to place all eparchies in Macedonia under special administration. In 1993, auxiliary bishop Jovan Mladenović of Tetovo (in the region of Polog near Skopje) was appointed administrator of all eparchies in the Republic of Macedonia. The following year, he was transferred to another see and administration of eparchies in FYRM was given to Bishop Pahomije Gačić of Vranje. In 2002, the Eparchy of Skopje was placed under the administration of Bishop Jovan Vraniškovski of Veles, as an exarch of the Serbian patriarch. In 2005, he was confirmed as Archbishop of Ohrid and Metropolitan of Skopje.

Heads
Early bishops of ancient Scupi (Dardania)

Metropolitans of Skopje (since 1766, list incomplete)

See also
 Orthodox Ohrid Archbishopric
 Archbishop Jovan VI of Ohrid
 Eparchy of Debar and Kičevo
 Eparchy of Polog and Kumanovo
 List of eparchies of the Serbian Orthodox Church

References

Sources

External links
 Biography of the Archbishop of Ohrid and Metropolitan of Skopje
 Archbishopric of Ohrid and Metropolitanate of Skopje
 Tomos on the church autonomy of the Orthodox Ohrid Archbishopric
 Serbian Orthodox Church

Orthodox Ohrid Archbishopric
Religious sees of the Serbian Orthodox Church